J. S. Hill House was a historic home located at Winston-Salem, Forsyth County, North Carolina.  The house was built about 1893, and was a large two-story, three bay, frame dwelling.  The front facade had a projecting two-story bay with prominent gable. It was built by J. S. Hill, the chief fund raiser for the Slater Industrial Academy for African-American students. The house has been demolished.

It was listed on the National Register of Historic Places in 1979.

References

External links

African-American history in Winston-Salem, North Carolina
Historic American Buildings Survey in North Carolina
Houses on the National Register of Historic Places in North Carolina
Houses completed in 1893
Houses in Winston-Salem, North Carolina
National Register of Historic Places in Winston-Salem, North Carolina